Verba may refer to:

 Verba, Rivne Oblast, a village in Ukraine
 Verba (band), a Polish band from Piła formed in 1997
 Verba (surname)
 In Medieval music, a type of trope
 9K333 Verba, Russian man-portable air-defense system ⋅
 Verba (MLRS), a Ukrainian multiple rocket launcher
Verba, Lithuanian variety of Easter palms

See also